Dippach is a commune and small town in south-western Luxembourg. It is part of the canton of Capellen, which is part of the district of Luxembourg.  The commune's administrative centre is Schouweiler. The River Mess, a tributary of the Alzette, rises here.

, the town of Dippach, which lies in the north-east of the commune, has a population of 790.  Other villages within the commune include Bettange-sur-Mess, Schouweiler, and Sprinkange.

Population

Twin towns — sister cities

Dippach is twinned with:
 Landiras, France

Aerial views

References

External links
 

 
Communes in Capellen (canton)
Towns in Luxembourg